Kieserite, or magnesium sulfate monohydrate, is a hydrous magnesium sulfate mineral with formula (MgSO4·H2O).

It has a vitreous luster and it is colorless, grayish-white or yellowish. Its hardness is 3.5 and crystallizes in the monoclinic crystal system. Gunningite is the zinc member of the kieserite group of minerals.

Etymology
It is named after Dietrich Georg von Kieser (Jena, Germany 1862)

Occurrence

Kieserite commonly occurs in marine evaporites and rarely in volcanic environments as a sublimate. It occurs in association with halite, carnallite, polyhalite, anhydrite, boracite, sulfoborite, leonite, epsomite and celestine.

Mars
In early 2005, Mars Express, a European Space Agency orbiter, discovered evidence of kieserite in patches of Valles Marineris (the largest canyon on Mars), along with gypsum and polyhydrated sulfates.  This is direct evidence of Mars's watery past and augments similar discoveries made by the Mars Exploration Rover Opportunity in 2004.

Moons of Jupiter 
Kieserite might also be a rock-forming mineral in the icy mantle of the outer three Galilean moons (Europa, Ganymede, Callisto). At pressures higher than 2.7 GPa, kieserite transforms to a triclinic crystal structure.

Uses

It is used in the production of Epsom salt and as a fertilizer, the overall global annual usage in agriculture in the mid 1970s was 2.3 million tons.
Kieserite is also used for cleaning hard water deposits from tiles, stones, and other pool and fountain lining materials. Due to its hardness, which is greater than hard water deposits but less than tiles and other water feature linings, it is blasted at the hard water deposits to remove them.

See also
 List of minerals
 List of minerals named after people

When to use kieserite as a fertilizer
Response to Kieserite is likely where:
• Soil Mg levels are low
• pH is high
• Intensive liming occurs to raise the pH
• Nitrogen is applied as ammonium, as this can lead to an antagonism between ammonium and magnesium
• Compacted soils exist
• There is a period of wet/cold weather
• Dry weather occurs leading to low magnesium mobility in the soil profile.

References

Magnesium minerals
Sulfate minerals
Monoclinic minerals
Minerals in space group 15
Evaporite